Makarov is a 1993 Russian thriller drama film directed by Vladimir Khotinenko. The film won the Nika Award for Best Picture of the Year in 1994.

Plot 
The film tells about the poet Alexander Sergeyevich Makarov, who received a pistol from the system of his namesake, which radically changed his life and relations with people around him.

Cast 
 Sergey Makovetsky as Aleksandr Sergeyevich Makarov
 Elena Mayorova as Natasha, his wife (as Yelena Majorova)
 Irina Metlitskaya as Margo
 Vladimir Ilyin as Vasya
 Sergei Parshin
 Leonid Okunyov		
 Evgeniy Steblov
 Viktor Smirnov	
 Ilya Rutberg
 Ivan Agafonov

References

External links 
 

1993 films
1990s Russian-language films
Russian thriller drama films
1990s thriller drama films